McCutchan is a surname. Notable people with the surname include:

Robert Guy McCutchan (1877-1958), American hymnologist
Arad McCutchan (1912–1993), American basketball coach
Eric McCutchan (1913–1991), Australian rules football administrator

See also
McCutcheon (disambiguation)